Richárd Guzmics (born 16 April 1987) is a Hungarian former professional footballer who plays as a centre back. He is a product of the Szombathelyi Haladás youth academy.

Club career

Wisla Krakow
On 10 September 2014, Guzmics was signed by Ekstraklasa club Wisla Krakow.

On 18 December 2014, Guzmics suffered a knee injury on the last match of the year against Ruch Chorzów in the 2014–15 Ekstraklasa season.

Yanbian Funde
On 5 January 2017, it was officially announced that Guzmics had signed for Yanbian Funde

Slovan Bratislava
On 26 January 2019, Guzmics returned to Europa signing for Slovan Bratislava.

International career
Guzmics gained notoriety in his international career against an ill-fated match against arch-rivals Romania, when in the second minute his defensive fumble allowed Ciprian Marica to score an early goal - the match would end with 3–0, with Guzmics being universally blamed for it, a blame he accepted. On 7 September 2015, Guzmics scored his first goal for Hungary in a 1–1 draw against Northern Ireland at the Windsor Park, in Belfast, Northern Ireland. After his performance against Norway, he was selected as one of the best defenders of the playoffs.

Guzmics was selected for Hungary's Euro 2016 squad.

On 14 June 2016, Guzmics played in the first group match in a 2–0 victory over Austria at the UEFA Euro 2016 Group F match at Nouveau Stade de Bordeaux, Bordeaux, France. Three days later on 18 June 2016 he played in a 1–1 draw against Iceland at the Stade Vélodrome, Marseille. He also played in the last group match in a 3–3 draw against Portugal at the Parc Olympique Lyonnais, Lyon on 22 June 2016.

Career statistics

Club

International

Scores and results list Hungary's goal tally first, score column indicates score after each Guzmics goal.

Honours
Slovan Bratislava
Slovak Super Liga: 2018–19

References

External links
 
 
 Profile on haladas.hu 
 Profile on starsandfriends.hu 
 Profile on Hlsz.hu 
 

1987 births
Living people
Sportspeople from Szombathely
Hungarian footballers
Association football defenders
Hungary international footballers
Hungary under-21 international footballers
UEFA Euro 2016 players
Szombathelyi Haladás footballers
Nemzeti Bajnokság I players
Nemzeti Bajnokság II players
Wisła Kraków players
Yanbian Funde F.C. players
ŠK Slovan Bratislava players
Slovak Super Liga players
Mezőkövesdi SE footballers
Ekstraklasa players
Chinese Super League players
China League One players
Hungarian expatriate footballers
Hungarian expatriate sportspeople in Poland
Hungarian expatriate sportspeople in China
Hungarian expatriate sportspeople in Slovakia
Expatriate footballers in Poland
Expatriate footballers in China
Expatriate footballers in Slovakia